The 1993–94 Argentine Primera División was a season of top-flight professional football in Argentina. The league season had two champions, with River Plate winning the Apertura (25th. league title for the club), while Independiente won the Clausura championship (15th. league title). Banfield (as champion of 1992–93 Primera B Nacional) and Gimnasia y Tiro (winner of "Torneo Octogonal" after beating Central Córdoba de Rosario in a two-legged series) promoted from the Primera B Nacional (second division).

On the other hand, Gimnasia y Tiro and Estudiantes de La Plata were relegated to Primera B Nacional.

Torneo Apertura

Final standings

Top scorers

Torneo Clausura

Final standings

Top scorers

Relegation

See also
1993–94 in Argentine football

References

Argentine Primera División seasons
1
Argentine
Argentine